Donald K. Peterson is an American executive. Creator and former CEO of Avaya, he was formerly the CFO of Lucent.

Peterson graduated from Worcester Polytechnic Institute in 1971 and Dartmouth College Tuck School of Business in 1973.

References

Living people
Avaya
Avaya employees
American technology chief executives
American chief financial officers
Worcester Polytechnic Institute alumni
Tuck School of Business alumni
Year of birth missing (living people)